Las Flores, or Balneario Las Flores is a resort (balneario) in the Maldonado Department of southeastern Uruguay.

Geography
It borders the resort Bella Vista to its west and the resort Playa Verde to its east, separated by the stream Arroyo Tarariras from the later.

Population
In 2011 Las Flores had a population of 221 permanent inhabitants and 473 dwellings.
 
Source: Instituto Nacional de Estadística de Uruguay

References

External links
INE map of Las Flores, Playa Verde, Playa Hermosa and Playa Grande

Populated places in the Maldonado Department
Seaside resorts in Uruguay